"If You Could Only See Me Now" is a song written by Susan Longacre and Rick Giles, and recorded by American country music artist T. Graham Brown.  It was released in April 1990 as the first single from the album Bumper to Bumper.  The song reached number 6 on the Billboard Hot Country Singles & Tracks chart.

Chart performance

Year-end charts

References

1990 singles
T. Graham Brown songs
Song recordings produced by Barry Beckett
Capitol Records Nashville singles
Songs written by Rick Giles
Songs written by Susan Longacre
1990 songs